David, Dafydd, Dai, Dave, Davy, or Di Jones may refer to:

People

Arts and entertainment

Music
 David Jones (jazz musician) (1888–1956), American jazz saxophonist
 Davy Jones (musician) (1945–2012), English musician and member of The Monkees
 David Bowie (David Robert Jones, 1947–2016), English musician and actor
 Dave Jones (drummer) (active since 1983), drummer with Agnostic Front
 David Jones (drummer), Australian drummer
 David Evan Jones (composer) (born 1946), composer and University of California, Santa Cruz music professor
 David Lynn Jones (born 1950), American country music singer-songwriter

Other
 David Jones (director) (1934–2008), English stage, television and film director
 David Jones (presenter), English sports broadcaster on Sky Sports since 1999
 David Jones (artist-poet) (1895–1974), British modernist poet, writer, and artist
 David Jones (programmer) (active in 1980s), former freelance computer game programmer
 David Jones (video game developer) (born 1966), Scottish video game programmer and entrepreneur
 David Jones (writer), creator of the television series Fireman Sam
 Dai Jones (David John Jones, 1943–2022), Welsh television presenter and radio broadcaster
 David Annwn Jones (born 1953), Anglo-Welsh poet, critic and teacher
 David Elwyn Jones (1945–2003), Welsh writer, politician, and poet
 David R. Jones (journalist) (born ), American journalist, winner of two Gerald Loeb Awards.
 David Watkin Jones, Welsh poet, historian and geologist

Business
 David B. Jones (1848–1923), American president and chairman of the board of directors of the Mineral Point Zinc Company
 David Jones (merchant) (1793–1873), Welsh-Australian department store founder
 David Jones (advertising executive) (born 1966), English born businessman

Military
 David Jones (VC) (1892–1916), English recipient of the Victoria Cross
 David M. Jones (1913–2008), U.S. Air Force major general, one of Doolittle's Raiders
 David C. Jones (1921–2013), U.S. Air Force general, chairman Joints Chief of Staff
 David Rumph Jones (1825–1863), Confederate general

Politics

Canada
 David Jones (Upper Canada politician) (1792–1870), lawyer, judge and political figure
 David Ford Jones (1818–1887), Ontario manufacturer and political figure

United Kingdom
 David Jones (Carmarthenshire MP) (1810–1869), Welsh banker and Conservative Party politician
 David Jones (Clwyd West MP) (born 1952), Conservative Party MP, former AM and Welsh Secretary
 D. T. Jones (David Thomas Jones, 1899–1963), Labour Party Member of Parliament for Hartlepool, 1945–1959
 David Brynmor Jones (1851–1921), barrister, historian and Liberal Member of Parliament

United States
 David C. Jones (1921–2013), chairman of the Joint Chiefs of Staff
 David W. Jones (1815–1879), secretary of state of Wisconsin
 David P. Jones (1860–1927), two-time mayor of Minneapolis, Minnesota
 Dave Jones (politician) (born 1962), California insurance commissioner

Elsewhere
 David Jones (New Zealand politician) (1873–1941), New Zealand politician
 David Jones (Guernsey politician) (1949–2016), Minister of Housing in Guernsey, Channel Islands
 David Ivon Jones (1883–1924), Welsh Communist, newspaper editor, and political prisoner in South Africa

Religion
 David Jones (Llangan) (1736–1810), Welsh Church of England priest who was supportive of Methodism
 David Jones (missionary) (1796–1841), Welsh missionary in Madagascar
 David Evan Jones (missionary) (1870–1947), Welsh missionary in Mizoram, India
 David Jones (Dean of Llandaff) (1870–1949), Dean of Llandaff Cathedral
 David Jones (archdeacon of Carmarthen) (1874–1950), Archdeacon of Carmarthen
 David Colin Jones (born 1943), American bishop
 David Bevan Jones (1807–1863), Welsh Baptist minister

Science, engineering and academia
 David A. Jones (active since 1995), head of the National Climate Centre at the Australian Bureau of Meteorology
 David Dallas Jones (1887–1956), president of Bennett College in Greensboro, North Carolina and brother of Robert Elijah Jones
 David E. H. Jones (1938–2017), best known as Daedalus, British writer and scientist
 David James Jones (1886–1947), Welsh philosopher and academic
 David Lewis Jones (1945–2010), Welsh historian and librarian
 David L. Jones (botanist) (born 1944), Australian horticultural botanist
 David L. Jones (video blogger) (active since 2009), Australian electronic engineer and blogger
 David Wyn Jones (born 1950), British musicologist
 David R. Jones (biologist) (1941–2010), recipient of Flavelle Medal
 David Tudor Jones (born 1966), professor of bioinformatics

Sports

American football
 David Jones (Browns owner), majority owner of the Cleveland Browns from 1953 to 1961
 David Jones (Cardinals owner) (1883–1966), American football team owner for the Chicago Cardinals
 David Jones (cornerback) (born 1985), American football player
 David Jones (offensive lineman) (born 1961), American football player for the Washington Redskins
 David Jones (safety) (born 1993), American football player; see 2017 New England Patriots season
 David Jones (tight end) (born 1968), American football player for the Los Angeles Raiders
 Dave Jones (American football) (born 1947), American football player
 Deacon Jones (David D. Jones, 1938–2013), American football player

Association football
 Davy Jones (footballer, born 1914), 1914-1998, English footballer for Bury
 Dave Jones (footballer, born 1932), Welsh footballer
 Dave Jones (footballer, born 1956), English footballer and manager
 David Jones (footballer, born 1910) (1910–1971), Welsh international footballer
 David Jones (footballer, born 1914) (1914–1988), Welsh footballer
 David Jones (footballer, born 1935) (1935–2014), English footballer
 David Jones (footballer, born 1936), Welsh footballer
 David Jones (footballer, born 1940) (1940–2013), English footballer
 David Jones (footballer, born 1950), English footballer for York City
 David Jones (footballer, born 1952), Welsh international footballer
 David Jones (footballer, born 1954), English footballer, played and managed in the Faroe Islands
 David Jones (soccer, born 1955), Australian association footballer
 David Jones (footballer, born 1964), English footballer
 David Jones (footballer, born 1984), English footballer
 Dai Jones (footballer, born 1941), Welsh footballer
 Di Jones (1866–1902), Welsh footballer

Rugby
 David Jones (rugby, born 1881) (1881–1933), rugby union and rugby league footballer
 David Phillips Jones (1881–1936), rugby union footballer
 David Jones (rugby, born 1900) (1900–1968), rugby union and rugby league footballer of the 1920s
 David Jones (Welsh rugby), rugby league footballer of the 1960s
 Dafydd Jones (born 1979), rugby union footballer for Wales, and (Llanelli) Scarlets

Other sports
 David Jones (athlete) (born 1940), British sprinter and Olympic bronze medallist
 David Jones (darts player) (1949–1995), Welsh darts player
 David Jones (ice hockey) (born 1984), Canadian ice hockey player for the Minnesota Wild
 David Jones (golfer) (born 1947), Northern Irish professional golfer
 David Jones (cricketer, born 1914) (1914–1998), English cricketer
 David Jones (cricketer, born 1920) (1920–1990), Welsh cricketer
 David Jones (sailor) (born 1940), sailor from United States Virgin Islands
 David Jones (sport shooter) (born 1977), Australian sports shooter
 Dai St. John (David Jones, 1879–1899), Welsh heavyweight boxer
 David R. Jones (golfer), English golfer and winner of the 1991 Zambia Open
 David Jones (table tennis), English table tennis player
 Dave Jones (volleyball) (born 1959), Canadian volleyball player

Other people
 David Jones (barrister) (1765–1816), Welsh barrister
 David Jones (railway) (1834–1906), locomotive superintendent of the Highland Railway in Scotland
 David R. Jones (organizer) (1938–1998), Charles Edison Memorial Youth Fund co-founder
 David R. Jones (architect) (1832–1915), Welsh-American architect and poet
 David Lloyd Jones (architect) (born 1942), in London
 David Lloyd Jones, Lord Lloyd-Jones (born 1952), British Supreme Court judge
 David Thomas Jones (administrator) (1866–1931), British administrator and author
 David Jones (died 1872), lynching victim

Other uses
 David Robert Jones (Fringe), fictional character of the science-fiction television series
 David Jones Limited (founded 1838), a chain of department stores in Australia
 David Jones (album), a 1965 album by Davy Jones

See also
 David Robert Jones (disambiguation)
 Davy Jones (disambiguation)
 David Rhys-Jones (born 1962), former Australian rules footballer
 Dafydd Jones (disambiguation)